Hội An, formerly known as Fai-Fo or Faifoo, is a city with a population of approximately 120,000 in Vietnam's Quảng Nam Province and is noted as a UNESCO World Heritage Site since 1999. Along with the Cu Lao Cham archipelago, it is part of the Cu Lao Cham-Hoi An Biosphere Reserve, designated in 2009.

Old Town Hội An, the city's historic district, is recognized as an exceptionally well-preserved example of a Southeast Asian trading port dating from the 15th to the 19th century, its buildings and street plan reflecting a blend of indigenous and foreign influences. Prominent in the city's old town is its covered "Temple Bridge", dating to the 16th–17th century.

Etymology
Hội An (chữ Hán: 會安) translates as "peaceful meeting place" from Sino-Vietnamese. In English and other European languages, the town was known historically as Faifo. This word is derived from Vietnamese Hội An phố (the town of Hội An), which was shortened to "Hoi-pho", and then to "Faifo". It has also been known as Hải Phố, Hoài Phố, Hội Phố, Hoa Phố, Haiso  and during the Champa period, it was named Lam Ap Pho.

History

Cham period (century II-XV)

Between the seventh and 10th centuries, the Cham (people of Champa) controlled the strategic spice trade and with this came tremendous wealth. 

The early history of Hội An is that of the Cham. These Austronesian-speaking Malayo-Polynesian peoples created the Champa Empire which occupied much of what is now central and lower Vietnam, from Huế to beyond Nha Trang.  Various linguistic connections between Cham and the related Jarai language and the Austronesian languages of Indonesia (particularly Acehnese), Malaysia, and Hainan have been documented.  In the early years, Mỹ Sơn was the spiritual capital, Trà Kiệu was the political capital and Hội An was the commercial capital of the Champa Empire - later, by the 14th century, the Cham moved further down towards Nha Trang. The river system was used for the transport of goods between the highlands, inland countries of Laos and Thailand and the lowlands.

Vietnamese period

In 1306, the Vietnamese and the Cham signed a land treaty, in which Cham king Jaya Simhavarman III gave Dai Viet the two provinces of Ô and Lý in exchange for a long-term peace and marriage with king Trần Nhân Tông's daughter Huyền Trân. In 1471 Emperor Lê Thánh Tông of Đại Việt annexed Champa and Hội An became a Vietnamese urban, also the capital of province Quảng Nam. In 1535 Portuguese explorer and sea captain António de Faria, coming from Da Nang, tried to establish a major trading centre at the port village of Faifo. Since 1570, Southern Vietnam had been under control of powerful Nguyễn clan, established by governor Nguyễn Hoàng. The Nguyễn lords were far more interested in commercial activity than the Trịnh lords who ruled the north. As a result, Hội An flourished as a trading port and became the most important trade port on the South China sea. Captain William Adams, the English sailor and confidant of Tokugawa Ieyasu, is known to have made one trading mission to Hội An in 1617 on a Red Seal Ship. 
The early Portuguese Jesuits also had one of their two residences at Hội An.

Hội An was a divided town with the Japanese settlement across the "Japanese Bridge" (16th-17th century). The bridge (Chùa cầu) is a unique covered structure built by the Japanese merchants, the only known covered bridge with a Buddhist temple attached to one side. In the 18th century, Hội An was considered by Chinese and Japanese merchants to be the best destination for trading in all of Southeast Asia, even Asia. The city also rose to prominence as a powerful and exclusive trade conduit between Europe, China, India, and Japan, especially for the ceramic industry. Shipwreck discoveries have shown that Vietnamese and Asian ceramics were transported from Hội An to as far as Sinai, Egypt.

Hội An's importance waned sharply at the end of the 18th century because of the collapse of Nguyễn rule (thanks to the Tây Sơn Rebellion - which was opposed to foreign trade). In 1775, Hội An had been the battleground between Trịnh army and Tây Sơn rebels, and the city was destroyed. Then, with the triumph of Emperor Gia Long, he repaid the French for their aid by giving them exclusive trade rights to the nearby port town of Đà Nẵng. Đà Nẵng became the new centre of trade (and later French influence) in central Vietnam while Hội An was a forgotten backwater. Local historians also say that Hội An lost its status as a desirable trade port due to silting up of the river mouth. The result was that Hội An remained almost untouched by the changes to Vietnam over the next 200 years. The efforts to revive the city were only done in 1990s by a Polish architect and conservator from Lublin and influential cultural educator, Kazimierz Kwiatkowski Kazik, who finally brought back Hội An to the world. There is a statue for the Polish architect in the city, and remains a symbol of the relationship between Poland and Vietnam, which share many historical commons despite its distance.

Today, the town is a tourist attraction because of its history, traditional architecture, and crafts such as textiles and ceramics. Many bars, hotels, and resorts have been constructed both in Hội An and the surrounding area. The port mouth and boats are still used for both fishing and tourism.

Weather

Hoi An has two main seasons during the year: rainy and dry seasons, with a warm average temperature of 29 °C during the year. The hottest period is from June to August when the highest temperature can reach 38°C during day time. November to January are the coldest months, with an average temperature of 20 °C. The rainy season lasts from September to January with heavy rains which can cause floods and affect tourism. The city's dry season is between February and May, when the weather becomes very mild with moderate temperature and less humid.
Calm mild weather is now limited to the season of May/June - end of August when the seas are calm and wind changes direction and comes from the South.  The remainder of the year the weather is intermittent between rain & cold and hot & mild. Activities such as visiting the offshore Cù lao Chàm islands are only guaranteed to be likely during the short season of the of May to the end of August, which is the high season for domestic tourism.

Heritage and tourism
In 1999 the old town was declared a World Heritage Site by UNESCO as a well-preserved example of a Southeast Asian trading port of the 15th to 19th centuries, with buildings that display a blend of local and foreign influences. According to the UNESCO Impact Report 2008 on Hội An, there are challenges for stakeholders to protect the heritage from tourism. 

Owing to the increased number of tourists visiting Hoi An a variety of activities are emerging that allow guests to get out of the old quarter and explore by motorbike, bicycle, kayak, or motorboat. The Thu Bon River is still essential to the region more than 500 years after António de Faria first navigated it and it remains an essential form of food production and transport. As such kayak and motorboat rides are becoming an increasingly common tourist activity.

This longtime trading port city offers a distinctive regional cuisine that blends centuries of cultural influences from East and Southeast Asia. Hoi An hosts a number of cooking classes where tourists can learn to make cao lầu or braised spiced pork noodle, a signature dish of the city.

The Hoi An wreck, a shipwreck from the late fifteenth or early sixteenth century, was discovered near the Cham Islands, off the coast of the city in the 1990s. Between 1996 and 1999, nearly three hundred thousand artifacts were recovered by the excavation teams, that included the Vietnamese National Salvage Corporation and Oxford University’s Marine Archaeology Research Division.

Another attraction is the Hoi An Lantern Full Moon Festival taking place every full moon cycle. The celebrations honour the ancestors. People exchange flowers, lanterns, candles, and fruits for prosperity and good fortune.

The Faifo Coffee house has an open air rooftop that has become a particularly popular location for Asian tourists to stop for well dressed selfies and posed photos.

In 2019, Hoi An was listed as one of Vietnam's key culture-based tourist areas where rampant tourism growth 'threatens the sustainability". Excessive tourism in the past has also damaged the eco-system of Chàm Islands-Hội An Marine Protected Area.

Museums
The city has four museums highlighting the history of the region. These museums are managed by the Hoi An Center for Cultural Heritage Management and Preservation. Entrance to the museum is permitted with a Hoi An Entrance Ticket.

The Museum of History and Culture, at 13 Nguyen Hue St, was originally a pagoda, built in the 17th century by Minh Huong villagers to worship the Guanyin, and is adjacent to the Guan Yu temple. It contains original relics from the Sa Huynh, Champa, Dai Viet and Dai Nam periods, tracing the history of Hoi An's inhabitants from its earliest settlers through to French colonial times.

The Hoi An Folklore Museum, at 33 Nguyen Thai Hoc Street, was opened in 2005, and is the largest two-storey wooden building in the old town, at 57m long and 9m wide, with fronts at Nguyen Thai Hoc St and Bach Dang St. On the second floor, there are 490 artifacts, organised into four areas: plastic folk arts, performing folk arts, traditional occupations and artifacts related to the daily life of Hoi An residents.

The Museum of Trade Ceramics is located at 80 Tran Phu Street, and was established in 1995, in a restored wooden building, originally built around 1858. The items originating from Persia, China, Thailand, India and other countries are proof of the importance of Hội An as a major trading port in South East Asia.

The Museum of Sa Huỳnh Culture, is located at 149 Tran Phu Street. Established in 1994, this museum displays a collection of over 200 artifacts from the Sa Huỳnh culture—considered to be the original settlers on the Hội An site—dating to over 2000 years ago. This museum is considered to be the most unusual collection of Sa Huỳnh artefacts in Vietnam.

The Precious Heritage Art Gallery Museum is located at 26 Phan Boi Chau. It includes a 500m2 display of photos and artifacts collected by Réhahn during the past 10 years of the French photographer's explorations of Vietnam.

Food
According to CNN, Hoi An is the "banh mi capital of Vietnam." Banh Mi is a type of Vietnamese sandwich, consisting of a baguette, pâté, meats and fresh herbs.

The regional dish is Cao lầu, consisting of rice noodles, meat, greens, bean sprouts, and herbs, most commonly served with a small amount of broth. The water for the broth has been traditionally taken from the Ba Le Well, thought to have been built in the 10th century by the Chams.

Other regional specialties include mi quang noodles, banh bao banh vac, hoanh thanh, com ga (chicken with rice), bánh xèo, sweet corn soup and baby clam salad are also regional specialties. They make a local chili sauce, Ớt Tương Triều Phát, widely popular throughout Vietnam.

Gallery

See also
 Kim Bồng woodworking village
 Hội An wreck

References

External links

 Hoi An Ancient Town from UNESCO
 Hoi An World Heritage - Government website with tourist information.
Cu Lao Cham - Hoi An Biosphere Reserve from UNESCO
 
 

Districts of Quảng Nam province
Populated places in Quảng Nam province
 
World Heritage Sites in Vietnam
Cities in Vietnam